is a Japanese politician of the Democratic Party of Japan, a member of the House of Councillors in the Diet (national legislature). A native of Niihama, Ehime and high school graduate, he was elected for the first time in 2004.

References

External links 
  in Japanese.

Members of the House of Councillors (Japan)
Living people
1949 births
Democratic Party of Japan politicians